José María Bravo Fernández-Hermosa (8 April 1917 – 26 December 2009) was a Spanish Republican fighter pilot and flying ace. During the Spanish Civil War, he fought for the Second Republic and later for the Soviet Union in the Second World War. Until his death in 2009, he was the highest-scoring Spanish fighter pilot still alive.

Early life 
José María Bravo was born Madrid in 1917 and studied at the Institución Libre de Enseñanza, where he was considered a good student. His good grades won him a place at a study-abroad program in Germany.

Spanish Civil War 

Upon the outbreak of the Spanish Civil War in July 1936, Bravo volunteered to serve in the Spanish Republican Air Force. He had already flown gliders. Bravo was accepted and traveled to the Soviet Union as part of the first course of pilots. After six months of training in Kirovabad, he returned to Spain in June 1937 as a non-commissioned fighter pilot and an expert in the state-of-the-art Polikarpov I-16 monoplanes. He flew with Russian pilots in the 1ª Escuadrilla de Moscas. His command abilities and charisma earned him multiple promotions: Teniente (11 March 1938) and Capitán (31 May 1938).

He was put in command of the 3ª Escuadrilla de Moscas and participated in the battles of the Levante and Ebro. This squadron achieved the most aerial victories during the Levante Campaign, with 10 credited to Bravo. On 27 August 1938, he became the adjutant of Grupo 21 de Caza (under the command of Manuel Zarauza Clavero and composed of I-16 fighters) at only 22 years old. The Republican defeat at the Ebro made imminent Republican defeat inevitable and the Catalonia Offensive forced the remaining Republican pilots to flee to France, Bravo among them. He was credited with 23 individual aerial victories achieved during 160 aerial combats and 1200 flying hours. He flew the I-16s marked CM-193 y CM-249.

Second World War 
He was imprisoned in the refugee camps at Gurs and Argelès-sur-Mer in southern France until fleeing to the Soviet Union, where he resumed his studies at Járkov (Ukraine), until the invasion of the Soviet Union in 1941. He tried to join the Red Air Force but the Soviet commanders declined to take Spanish pilots, so he had to join a unit of miners and nighttime saboteurs operating in the Azov area. In 1942, he was accepted into the VVS along with several other former Republican pilots and participated in the defense of the Baku area during the Battle of the Caucuses. In 1943, he led the aerial escort for Stalin in his trip to Tehran for the Teheran Conference. In 1948, he was demobilized.

Return to Spain 
After leaving the VVS he went to Moscow, where he worked at the Instituto Pedagógico de Idiomas teaching Spanish. In 1960, he returned to Spain without too much trouble from the Franquist authorities due to his past as a Spanish Republican combatant and his residence in the Soviet Union. From 1976, he helped found the Asociación De Aviadores de la República (ADAR) to obtain recognition for the military service of Spanish Republican aviators. This having been achieved, in 1978, he was named a colonel in the Ejército del Aire, with all associated privileges. Since then he collaborated with the Fundación Infante de Orleans, especially in its project to acquire an I-16. He continued to attend aerial demonstrations until his death in Madrid at the end of 2009.

Movie 
In 2012 a biographical movie, El Español (English: "The Spaniard", "Испанец" in the original Russian), directed by Aleksandr Tsatsuev (Александр ЦАЦУЕВ) and starring Vladimir Panchik (Владимир ПАНЧИК) as Bravo, was screened.

Memoir 
 José María Bravo & Rafael de Madariaga (2007); El seis doble: Bravo y los Moscas en la Guerra Civil Española y en la Segunda Guerra Mundial, Madrid. .

See also 
 List of Spanish Civil War flying aces
 Spanish Republican Air Force

References

External links (Spanish) 
 S.B.H.A.C., Galería de Militares Republicanos
 Nos deja José María Bravo, último "as" de la aviación republicana, Real Aero Club de España
 José María Bravo Fernández, el último gran 'as' de la República, El País

Spanish flying aces
Spanish aviators
Exiles of the Spanish Civil War in the Soviet Union
2009 deaths
Spanish military personnel of the Spanish Civil War (Republican faction)
1917 births
Soviet World War II pilots